The Municipal Demarcation Board is an independent authority responsible for delimiting the boundaries of South African districts and municipalities and the boundaries of the electoral wards within those municipalities.

General 

The Board was envisaged in section 155.(2)(b) of the Constitution, and created by the Local Government: Municipal Demarcation Act, 1998. It consists of nine board members, appointed by the President for a five-year term. Except for the Chairperson, the members of the Board serve on a part-time basis. There is also a small support staff for administration and research.

External links

See also 

In other countries demarcation can be called redistricting or redistribution.

Government agencies of South Africa